Bacolod is a highly urbanized city and the capital city of Negros Occidental, Philippines. It may also refer to:

Places
Bacolod, Lanao del Norte, a municipality in Lanao del Norte, Philippines
Bacolod-Kalawi, Lanao del Sur, a municipality in Lanao del Sur, Philippines
Metro Bacolod, a metropolitan area in Negros Occidental, Philippines centered on Bacolod City

People
Mark Shandii Bacolod, a Filipino director and producer
Nikki Bacolod, Filipina singer, television host, swimmer and actress

Ships
Bacolod City-class logistics support vessel, a class of transport ships of the Philippine Navy
, a transport ship of the Philippine Navy